Al-Zubayr ibn Bakkār ((788-870 CE / 172-256 AH), a descendant of al-Zubayr ibn al-ʻAwwām, was a leading Arab Muslim historian and genealogist of the Arabs, particularly the Hijaz region. He composed a number of works on genealogy that made him a standing authority on the subject of the genealogies of the Quraysh tribe. Ibn Hajar al-Asqalani regarded him as the most reliable authority on Qurayshite genealogy.

Biography 
He was born and raised in Medina and served as the qadi of Mecca in 242 AH ( CE). In one of his visits to Baghdad, Ibn Bakkar was invited by the Abbasid caliph al-Mutawakkil to become the tutor to his son.

He died in Mecca after he fell from a roof.

Works 
Works attributed to Ibn Bakkar:

Published works 
 Jamharat nasab Quraysh wa-akhbāruhā
 Al-Akhbār al-muwaffaqīyāt
 Ah̲bār Abī Abī Dahbal al-Jumaḥī
 Azwāj al-Nabī. The edited version is named: Al-Muntakhab min Kitāb azwāj al-Nabī
 Commentary on "Kitāb al-Amthāl" of Abū ʻUbayd al-Qāsim ibn Sallām
 Commentary on "Kitāb al-Nasab" of Abū ʻUbayd al-Qāsim ibn Sallām

Lost works 
 Akhbār al-ʻArab wa-ayyāmuhā- translit., "Arabs & Their Times"
 Nawādir akhbār al-nasab
 Al-ikhtilāf or Al-aḥlāf- translit., "Alliances" 
 Nawādir al-madanīyīn
 Al-nakhīl- translit., "Palm Trees"
 Al-ʻaqīq wa-akhbāruhu
 Al-Aws wa-al-Khazraj - translit., "The Aws & The Khazraj (Tribes)"

References 

788 births
870 deaths
Iraqi genealogists
Arab historians
9th-century Arabs
Islamic Chroniclers
9th-century historians from the Abbasid Caliphate
9th-century Arabic poets
People from Medina
Quraysh